Spry is a surname. Notable people with the surname include:

 Sir Charles Spry (1910–1994), director-general of the Australian Security Intelligence Organisation
 Constance Spry (1886–1960, née Fletcher), British educator, florist and author
 Major-General Daniel Spry (1913–1989), Canadian commander of the 3rd Canadian Infantry Division
 Eunice Spry (born 1944), British criminal
 Graham Spry (1900–1983), Canadian broadcaster
 Irene Spry (1907–1998), Canadian economic historian
 John Spry (priest) (1690–1763), Archdeacon of Berkshire
 Judith Spry, (born 1942, later Judith Moriarty), American politician, Missouri Secretary of State
 Keith Spry (1911-1991), New Zealand swimmer, conservationist and politician.
Lib Spry, Canadian playwright and director
 Sir Richard Spry (1715–1775), Admiral of the Royal Navy 
 Robin Spry (1939–2005), Canadian filmmaker and television producer
 William Spry (1864–1929), American politician, Governor of Utah
 Lieutenant-General William Spry, British army officer

See also
 Spry family